Tracy McCreery (born December 26, 1966) is an American politician who served in the Missouri House of Representatives from the 88th district from 2015 to 2023. Now she is serving in the Missouri Senate from district 24 in St. Louis County.

Electoral History

State Representative

State Senate

References

1966 births
Living people
Democratic Party members of the Missouri House of Representatives
21st-century American politicians
Women state legislators in Missouri
21st-century American women politicians